Janet De Gore (November 19, 1930 – June 11, 2022) was an American television and theatre actress.

Born in Larchmont, New York, De Gore began her career in 1950 starring as Janice in the Broadway play The Member of the Wedding. 

De Gore appeared in television programs including The Real McCoys, 77 Sunset Strip, Sugarfoot, The Outer Limits, Perry Mason, Branded, and The Farmer's Daughter. She starred in the legal drama television series The Law and Mr. Jones as the title character's secretary, Marsha Spear. She retired in 1966; her last television credit being for the western series Bonanza.

De Gore died on June 11, 2022, at the age of 91.

References

External links 

Rotten Tomatoes profile

1930 births
2022 deaths
20th-century American actresses
21st-century American women
People from Larchmont, New York
Actresses from New York (state)
American film actresses
American television actresses
American stage actresses